The 2018 AFC Cup qualifying play-offs were played from 22 January to 20 February 2018. A total of 13 teams competed in the qualifying play-offs to decide five of the 36 places in the group stage of the 2018 AFC Cup.

Teams
The following 13 teams, split into five zones (West Asia Zone, Central Asia Zone, South Asia Zone, ASEAN Zone, East Asia Zone), entered the qualifying play-offs, consisting of two rounds:
6 teams entered in the preliminary round.
7 teams entered in the play-off round.

Format

In the qualifying play-offs, each tie was played on a home-and-away two-legged basis. The away goals rule, extra time (away goals do not apply in extra time) and penalty shoot-out were used to decide the winner if necessary (Regulations Article 9.3). The five winners of the play-off round advanced to the group stage to join the 31 direct entrants.

Schedule
The schedule of each round was as follows (W: West Asia Zone; C: Central Asia Zone; S: South Asia Zone; A: ASEAN Zone; E: East Asia Zone).

Bracket

The bracket of the qualifying play-offs for each zone was determined by the AFC based on the association ranking of each team, with the team from the higher-ranked association hosting the second leg.

Play-off West Asia
 Al-Suwaiq advanced to Group A.

Play-off Central Asia
 Ahal advanced to Group D.

Play-off South Asia
 Bengaluru advanced to Group E.

Play-off ASEAN
 Boeung Ket Angkor advanced to Group F.

Play-off East Asia
 Hwaebul advanced to Group I.

Preliminary round

Summary
A total of six teams played in the preliminary round.

|+Central Asia Zone

|+South Asia Zone

Central Asia Zone

Ahal won 5–3 on aggregate.

South Asia Zone

Bengaluru won 3–0 on aggregate.

TC Sports won 4–1 on aggregate.

Play-off round

Summary
A total of 10 teams played in the play-off round: seven teams which entered in this round, and three winners of the preliminary round.

|+West Asia Zone

|+Central Asia Zone

|+South Asia Zone

|+ASEAN Zone

|+East Asia Zone

West Asia Zone

Al-Suwaiq won 2–1 on aggregate.

Central Asia Zone

Ahal won 3–0 on aggregate.

South Asia Zone

Bengaluru won 8–2 on aggregate.

ASEAN Zone

Boeung Ket Angkor won 4–3 on aggregate.

East Asia Zone

Hwaebul won 7–0 on aggregate.

Notes

References

External links
, the-AFC.com
AFC Cup 2018, stats.the-AFC.com

1
January 2018 sports events in Asia
February 2018 sports events in Asia